Vice Admiral Charles Watson (1714 – 16 August 1757) was an officer of the Royal Navy, who served briefly as colonial governor of Newfoundland, and died in Calcutta, India.

Origins
He was the son of John Watson by his wife the sister of Sir Charles Wager (1666–1743), First Lord of the Admiralty. The armorials used by his son the 1st baronet (Argent, on a chevron engrailled azure between three martlets sable as many crescents or) are a differenced version of the arms of the Watson family, Marquess of Rockingham, and thus the family may have been a cadet branch of the latter.

Naval career
He transferred to HMS Plymouth in May 1741 and to HMS Dragon in November 1742 which he commanded in the Battle of Toulon.

In 1746 he transferred to HMS Princess Louisa which he commanded at the First Battle of Cape Finisterre in May 1747 and in the Second Battle of Cape Finisterre in October 1747. In January 1748 he was appointed commander-in-chief of the Newfoundland and North American station with his flag in HMS Lion. He became governor of Newfoundland and commander-in-chief of Cape Breton. The position of governor of the colony had temporarily lapsed after the departure of Richard Edwards and therefore his successor, James Douglas, was not a governor of the island but commodore. No commodore nor governor was sent in 1747, but Charles Watson became the governor on arrival in 1748. As governor of Newfoundland he set about deporting Irish and Scots Catholics from the colony.

In 1754 he became Commander-in-Chief, East Indies. The English settlement at Fort William, India sought assistance from the Presidency of Fort St. George at Madras, which sent Colonel Robert Clive and Admiral Charles Watson. They re-captured Calcutta on 2 January 1757, but the Nawab marched again on Calcutta on 5 February 1757, and was surprised by a dawn attack by the English. This resulted in the Treaty of Alinagar on 7 February 1757. However the Nawab was subsequently bolstered by French support, and the Battle of Chandannagar in March, and then the Battle of Plassey in June 1757, followed. Watson was promoted to Vice-Admiral of the White in 1757.

Watson's quick rise through the ranks is thought to be attributed from his uncle, Sir Charles Wager, who was first lord of the admiralty. There is a memorial to Watson in Westminster Abbey, London.

Marriage and children
He married Rebecca Buller, daughter of John Francis Buller (1695–1751) of Morval in Cornwall, in 1741. She was co-heiress of the manor of Combe Martin, inherited jointly with her brother Francis Buller of Antony House in Cornwall from her father. Their son and heir was:
Sir Charles Watson, 1st Baronet, of Fulmer, Buckinghamshire, created a baronet in 1760.

See also 
 Governors of Newfoundland
 List of people from Newfoundland and Labrador

References

External links
Biography at Government House The Governorship of Newfoundland and Labrador
Memorial described at UK National Maritime Museum - Maritime Memorials
Admiral Watson's Monument in Calcutta

1714 births
1757 deaths
Governors of Newfoundland Colony
Royal Navy admirals
Royal Navy personnel of the War of the Austrian Succession
Royal Navy personnel of the Seven Years' War